Viktor Theodor Homén (3 July 1858, Pieksämäki - 10 April 1923) was a Finnish physicist and politician. He was a member of the Diet of Finland from 1905 to 1906 and of the Parliament of Finland from 1908 to 1913, representing the Young Finnish Party and again from 1919 to 1922, representing the National Coalition Party.

References

1858 births
1923 deaths
People from Pieksämäki
People from Mikkeli Province (Grand Duchy of Finland)
Finnish Lutherans
Young Finnish Party politicians
National Coalition Party politicians
Members of the Parliament of Finland (1908–09)
Members of the Parliament of Finland (1909–10)
Members of the Parliament of Finland (1910–11)
Members of the Parliament of Finland (1911–13)
Members of the Parliament of Finland (1919–22)
University of Helsinki alumni
Academic staff of the University of Helsinki